Clips4Sale (C4S) is an American adult video content selling website and is known for fetish content. It launched in 2003. Clips4Sale is the largest clip site on the internet with over 7 million clips and 105,000 independent content producers on its platform. It is based in Florida, United States.

In 2021, Clips4Sale was acquired by Centro Ventures, an adult influencer network.

August 22, 2022 Clips4Sale re-branded with a new wordmark and logo.

Market
A significant part of the market for Clips4Sale has come from consumers of amateur pornography. Some models on Clips4Sale have previously performed on webcam sites, and saw Clips4Sale as an opportunity for an additional stream of income by marketing pornographic videos of themselves.

Clips4Sale has been referenced by mainstream entertainment and the music industry when fetish related topics have been in the news.

Awards
 2015 AVN Awards: Best Alternative Website
 2014 XBIZ Awards: Fetish Site of the Year
 2011 Venus Awards: Best Fetish Website

References

External links 
 

Multilingual websites
American erotica and pornography websites
Video hosting
2003 establishments in the United States
Internet properties established in 2003
Companies based in Florida